Lešany is name of several locations in the Czech Republic:
Lešany (Benešov District)
Lešany (Prostějov District)